Mahmood Yakubu (born 1962) is a Nigerian academic and current chairman of Independent National Electoral Commission (INEC). Mahmood was appointed to office by President Muhammadu Buhari on 21 October 2015, succeeding Amina Zakari, who served as acting chairman.

Early life and education 
Mahmood Yakubu was born in Bauchi State, Northern Nigeria. He completed his basic and secondary school education at Kobi Primary School and Government Teachers College, Toro, respectively. He proceeded to the University of Sokoto (now Usmanu Danfodiyo University), where he became the first and, to date, only Nigerian from the North to obtain a first-class degree certificate in history. At postgraduate level, he studied international relations at Wolfson College, Cambridge, graduating with master's degree in 1987, and Nigerian history at the University of Oxford, graduating with a doctorate in 1991. The Bauchi State Government offered him a scholarship to study at both the University of Cambridge and the University of Oxford. He went on to become a three-time recipient of the Overseas Research Scholarship, and also won the Commonwealth Scholarship from the Association of Commonwealth Universities.

Career 
Yakubu is a lecturer, guerrilla warfare expert, and Professor of Political History and International Studies at the Nigerian Defence Academy. Prior to his appointment as Chairman of the Independent National Electoral Commission (INEC), Mahmood served as the executive secretary of the Tertiary Education Trust Fund, being appointed to office in 2007 by then-President Umaru Musa Yar'Adua. During his tenure as secretary, a National Book Development Fund was established, supporting 102 journals of professional associations.

Yakubu also served as Assistant Secretary of Finance and Administration at the 2014 National Conference. In 2013, he was awarded an honorary fellowship to the Nigerian Institute of Public Relations. 

On 7 January 2019,  he released a new voting system for the 2019 general election with the introduction of the card reader which helped to minimize electoral fraud. In 2023 through the amended electoral act, he introduced the BVAS which helped to stop the issue of over voting and electoral result padding which have been the bane of Nigeria electoral system. .

Works

References 

1962 births
Members of the Independent National Electoral Commission
Living people
People from Bauchi State
Usmanu Danfodiyo University alumni
Alumni of the University of Oxford
Cambridge Commonwealth Trust Scholars
Alumni of Wolfson College, Cambridge
Nigerian Defence Academy people